Killeen is a surname of Irish origin. Notable people with the surname include:

 Caroline Killeen (born 1926), American activist
 Donald Killeen (1923–1972), Irish-American criminal
 Evans Killeen (born 1936), American baseball player
 Graham Killeen (born 1980), American filmmaker and critic
 Gretel Killeen (born 1963), Australian television personality
 Henry Killeen (1872–1916), American baseball player
 J. J. Killeen (born 1981), American golfer
 James Jerome Killeen (1917–1978), American Roman Catholic bishop
 Jason Killeen (born 1980), Irish basketball player
 John Killeen (1920–2005), Irish hurler
 Len Killeen (1938–2011), South African rugby league footballer
 Lewis Killeen (born 1982), English football (soccer) player
 Liam Killeen (born 1982), English professional mountain biker
 Mark Killeen, British actor
 Neil Killeen (born 1975), English cricketer
 Oliver Killeen (born 1937), Irish bigamist and fraudster
 Peter Richard Killeen (born 1942), American psychologist
 Richard Killeen (born 1946), New Zealand painter, sculptor and digital artist
 Ryan Killeen (born 1983), American football (American football) player 
 Timothy Killeen (1923–1993), Irish  politician
 Tony Killeen (born 1952), Irish politician

See also
 Ó Cillín, original form of the surname

Surnames of Irish origin